Rajya Sabha elections were held in 1988, to elect members of the Rajya Sabha, Indian Parliament's upper chamber.

Elections
Elections were held in 1988 to elect members from various states.
The list is incomplete.

Members elected
The following members are elected in the elections held in 1988. They are members for the term 1988-94 and retire in year 1994, except in case of the resignation or death before the term.

State - Member - Party

Bye-elections
The following bye elections were held in the year 1988.

State - Member - Party

 Sikkim -  Karma Topden - INC (  ele  30/03/1988 term till 1993 )
 Bihar - Pratibha Singh - INC (  ele  03/04/1988 term till 1992 )
 Kerala - P K Kunjachen - CPM (  ele  22/08/1988 term till 1992 ) dea 14/06/1991
 Orissa -  Baikunatha Nath Sahu - INC (  ele  07/10/1988 term till 1990 )
 Maharashtra - S B Chavan - INC (  ele  28/10/1988 term till 1990 )
 Manipur - R.K. Dorendra Singh - INC (  elected  20/09/1988 term till 1990 )
 Nominated - Syeda Anwara Taimur - INC (  ele  25/11/1988 term till 1990 )
 Uttar Pradesh - Bir Bahadur Singh - INC (  ele  25/11/1988 term till 1990 ) dea 30/05/1989 
 Uttar Pradesh - Syed S Razi - INC (  ele 06/12/1988 term till 1992 )

References

1988 elections in India
1988